Spirit Island may refer to:

 Spirit Island (Alberta)
 Spirit Island (Minnesota), an island in Lake Minnetonka
 Spirit Island (board game)